"Hang On in There Baby" is a song written by American musician Johnny Bristol and arranged by H. B. Barnum as the title track from his first album.  It was released as a single in 1974, reaching No. 8 on the U.S. Hot 100 and No. 2 on the U.S. R&B chart. In the UK it reached No. 3.

Chart history

Weekly charts

Year-end charts

Curiosity version

English band Curiosity Killed the Cat, shortened to Curiosity, released a cover in 1992 under RCA Records as the debut single from their third album, Back to Front (1992). It is the band's joint biggest hit alongside "Down to Earth", peaking at No. 3 on the UK Singles Chart.

Track listings
7-inch and cassette
 "Hang On in There Baby" – 3:08
 "Meaning of Dreaming" – 4:20

12-inch
 "Hang On in There Baby" (Extended Club Mix) – 4:52
 Hang On in There Baby (After Hours Mix) – 3:52
 Hang On in There Baby (Dub Mix) – 3:52
 "Meaning of Dreaming" – 4:20

CD single
 Hang On in There Baby (7" Version) – 3:08
 "Hang On in There Baby" (Extended Club Mix) – 4:52
 "Meaning of Dreaming" – 4:20

Charts

Weekly charts

Year-end charts

Gary Barlow version

Barlow recorded the song in 1996, during recording sessions for his first solo work, Open Road. Although it was included on the British version of the album, it was never released as a single in the UK. In America, it was the third single off the record and was also released as a single in Germany, and to radio in the Netherlands due its popularity. The single version features vocals from American singer Rosie Gaines.

When Barlow started touring in promotion of Open Road, he hired Rosie Gaines as a support act. While on tour, he decided to record a new version of "Hang On in There Baby" featuring Gaines, which he intended to use for performance only. However, following a record deal with Arista and a plan to release Open Road in America, he and Gaines recorded a studio version for the album. On April 3, 1998, he released the duet version as the third American single from Open Road, and also issued it in the Netherlands. When Barlow's video album, Open Book, was released in the United Kingdom in June 1998, an accompanying single given away with the video featured the duet version of "Hang On in There Baby" as its lead track; the duet version had previously been unavailable in the UK.

Music video
The music video features footage of Barlow and Gaines performing the song on the Open Road tour, as well as backstage footage featuring Barlow's home life and rehearsals. A snippet of the video was included on Open Book; however, the full video has never been commercially released.

Track listing
 America
 "Hang On in There Baby" (Featuring Rosie Gaines) - 3:44
 "A Million Love Songs" (Live) - 4:55

 Netherlands
 "Hang On in There Baby" (Featuring Rosie Gaines) - 3:44
 "Hang On in There Baby" - 3:37
 "My Commitment" (Soulshock Mix) - 4:30
 "Hard to Handle" (Live) - 3:03
 "A Million Love Songs" (Live) - 4:55

 Open Book single
 "Hang On in There Baby" (Featuring Rosie Gaines) - 3:44
 "My Commitment" (Soulshock Mix) - 4:30
 "Hard to Handle" (Live) - 3:03
 "A Million Love Songs" (Live) - 4:55

Charts

Other versions 

 In 1979, American singer Bette Midler, for her fifth album Thighs and Whispers.
 In 1980, American disco girl group Alton McClain and Destiny, for their second album More of You. This features the vocals of Johnny Bristol.
 In 1993, American hip hop musician K7, for his debut album Swing Batta Swing.
 In 2000, British boy band Worlds Apart, in their CD single I Will Part 2.
 In 2005, X Factor winner Steve Brookstein, for his debut album Heart and Soul.
 In 2015, English boy band Blue, for their fifth album Colours.

References

External links
 

1974 songs
Bette Midler songs
Curiosity Killed the Cat songs
Gary Barlow songs
Rosie Gaines songs
1974 singles
1992 singles
1998 singles
Songs written by Johnny Bristol
Sony BMG singles
Arista Records singles
Pop ballads